The Lithuanian People's Aid Union ( or LLPS), also known as Lithuanian Red Aid before 1940, was an organization in Lithuania active from end of 1918 to June 1941. The organization was commonly referred to as 'MOPR' per the Russian acronym of its international counterpart, the International Red Aid. The Lithuanian Red Aid movement raised funds and donated money, food, clothes and shoes to imprisoned communists. Just like the Communist Party of Lithuania, the Lithuanian Red Aid was illegal in Lithuania during the interwar period.

Names
Over the year, the organization was known under several different names:
 1918–1922: Red Cross (Raudonasis kryžius), Political Red Cross of Lithuania and Lithuanian Workers' Red Cross. 
 1922: Lithuanian Red Cross to Rescue Prisoners of the White Terror
 1923: Lithuanian Red Aid Society.  
 1924–1939: Lithuanian Red Aid. 
 1940–1941: Lithuanian People's Aid Union

Activities
The organization was founded upon a decision of the first congress of the Communist Party of Lithuania and Belorussia in October 1918. The organization joined the International Red Aid (MOPR) in 1922.

In 1927 the organization began publishing the underground journal  ('Red Aid'), but publication was promptly discontinued. Raudonoji pagalba was again published clandestinely from Kaunas in 1932–1936. The editorial team of the publication consisted of B. Gensas, Barelis Fridmanas, Benjaminas Fogelevičius, Judita Komodaitė, Zalmenas Šapira, Irena Trečiokaitė-Žebenkienė and Faina Zaraitė. Between 1937 and 1940, the organization published another underground journal  ('To Aid') from Kaunas, with the editorial team consisting of B. Fridmanas, D. Berzakaitė, A. Maginskas.

By 1931 the organization was estimated to have 145 members. With the new popular front line of the communist movement that emerged from the 7th World Congress of the Comintern, the organization grew in influence. The Lithuanian Red Aid was the most prominent pro-communist organization in Lithuania as of the second half of the 1930s. As of 1935 the organization claimed 2,500 members. Per another account, cited in Sabaliūnas (1972), the organization had 1,250 members in 1936. In the second half of 1936, the organization managed to raise 19,681 Lithuanian litas from donations within Lithuania, compared to 3,600 litas received from MOPR Moscow HQ and 126 litas in other funds secured from abroad. The following of the Lithuanian Red Aid was leftist, but not exclusively communist. There were also businessmen contributed to the organization, presumably secure a good standing with the Soviet Union.

 was the Secretary of the Central Committee of the Red Aid during this period. The second congress of Red Aid was held in Kaunas between December 31, 1939 and January 1, 1940. Fourteen delegates representing some 6,000 members attended the event. The Kaunas branch was represented by B. Fridmanas, C. Maginskienė and M. Domeikienė, the Ukmergė branch by A. Česnuitis, the Utena–Zarasai branch by A. Mėlynis and the Šakiai branch by J. Juodišius. The congress changed the name of the organization to the Lithuanian People's Aid Union, declaring itself as a non-party organization committed to democratic rights, Lithuanian independence, and supporting victims of fascist repression. 

LLPS became a legal organization after the Soviet occupation of Lithuania in June 1940. By the beginning of 1941 membership had grown to about 60,000. The organization became defunct following the German invasion of the Soviet Union.

References

1918 establishments in Lithuania
1941 disestablishments in Lithuania
Organizations established in 1918
Organizations disestablished in 1941
Clubs and societies in Lithuania
Communism in Lithuania